SloTop50 is the official Slovenian singles chart provider established by SAZAS (The association of composers and authors for protection of copyright of Slovenia) in 2013. It presents weekly, monthly and yearly singles charts, following 61 various radio stations across Slovenia. It publishes weekly charts once a week, every Sunday. Chart contain data generated by the SloTop50 system according to any song played during the period starting the previous Monday morning at time 00:00:00 and ending Sunday night at 23:59:59.

The first number one song of the SloTop50 was "Srečno novo leto" by Rok'n'Band, on 6 January 2013. As of the issue for the week ending on 20 June 2021, the SloTop50 has had 90 different number one hits in total of 442 weeks. The current number one is "Save Your Tears" by The Weeknd.

History 

From 1997-2012 year-end singles chart existed for Slovenian artists only. Sazas measured songs that were most played on Slovenian radio stations. That was a different kind of measuring, no weekly charts, just the total number of repeats at the end of the year. In 2013 a new technology by international standards was introduced, measuring both Slovenian and international music with weekly singles charts.

Charts published 

Presently three charts are published:
SloTop50 Singles - weekly
SloTop50 Singles - monthly
SloTop50 Singles - yearly

Song of the year 
In three categories: year-end number-one song, year-end best charted domestic song and number-one (pre)xmas week song.

SloTop50 statistics 

After 442 weeks since chart was established (updated: 20 June 2021)

All songs reaching No.1

Best charted domestic songs

Most weeks on No.1

Artists with most weeks on No.1

Artists with most number 1's

Bum Award 
SAZAS gives "SloTop50 Bum Award" only to domestic artists who hit the peak chart position in first week of airplay:
"BQL" – "Heart of Gold" (5 March 2017)
"Maraaya" – "Diamond Duck" (8 October 2017)

External links
Official Slovenian singles chart

Record charts
Slovenian music